Peter Middleton (3 December 1931 – 24 May 2019) was a British motorcycle racer in the late 1950s and early 1960s. He started his Manx Grand Prix career by finishing second in the 1957 Senior Newcomers race and two years later was the winner of the 1959 Junior MGP, before moving on to the Isle of Man TT for a further three years. He was the 1962 Gold Cup winner at Oliver's Mount, Scarborough where he broke Geoff Duke's seven-year lap record with a 4-speed gearbox.

Selected career statistics

Death 

Middleton died of leukemia on 24 May 2019 at the Pinderfield's Hospital, Wakefield.

Tribute 
"The Fastest Lap: A Tribute to Peter Middleton" is scheduled to be released in 2023. The film is being directed by Middleton's son, Pete Middleton and features several interviews including world championship riders, John Cooper and Mick Chatterton.

References 

1931 births
2019 deaths
English motorcycle racers
Sportspeople from Doncaster
Deaths from leukemia
Deaths from cancer in England